Pioneer Park may refer to:

United States

Pioneer Park (Fairbanks, Alaska), Alaska
Pioneer Park (San Francisco), California; site of Coit Tower
Pioneer Park (Aspen, Colorado), a house listed on the National Register of Historic Places
Pioneer Park (Hardee County, Florida), a park in Zolfo Springs
Lincoln, Nebraska; also known as Pioneers Park
Pioneer Park (Los Cruces, New Mexico), in Alameda-Depot Historic District
Pioneer Park (stadium), Greeneville, Tennessee
Pioneer Park (Salt Lake City), located near Downtown Salt Lake City
Pioneer Park (Washington), in Tumwater, Washington
Moore-Turner Garden, Spokane, Washington; also known as Pioneer Park

South Africa
 Pioneer Park, Johannesburg, in the suburb of Rosettenville, Gauteng on the shore of Wemmer Pan

Australia
Pioneer Park, Angaston, in the main street of Angaston, South Australia
Pioneer Park, Fremantle, Western Australia
Pioneer Park, formerly the site of the Alberton Cemetery, South Australia